The Ammosov North-Eastern Federal University, NEFU, (in Russian: Северо-Восточный федеральный университет имени Максима Кировича Аммосова; in Sakha: М. К. Аммуоhап аатынан Хотугулуу-Илиҥҥи федеральнай университет) previously known as Yakutsk State University (in Russian: Якутский государственный университет имени Максима Кировича Аммосова), is the largest higher education institution in the Russian northeast and it is one of Russia's ten federal universities. NEFU's main campus is in Yakutsk (Sakha Republic), and it has two other campuses in Sakha (one in Mirny and one in Neryungri) as well as one in Anadyr in the Chukotka Autonomous Okrug.

The official name is Ammosov North-Eastern Federal University Federal State Autonomous Educational Institution of Higher Education. The undergraduate student population numbers over 16,000, while more than 500 students are engaged in postgraduate work. 1,600 academic staff are employed at the university. Of these 200 hold doctor’s degree, 800 are candidate of science degree. There are 15 institutes, 9 faculties, and 3 university branches in Mirny, Neryungri and Chukotka, and 5 major research institutes. 119 degree courses are available to students. The university occupies 9 buildings and 12 residence halls located mostly on the campus. 1,500,000 books, periodicals, and other items are held in the library. The university has a Geology Field Station, a Museum of Archeology and Ethnography, a botanical garden and an orangery open to staff and students' research and study. There is a stadium, swimming pool, and social centre. Students and staff have free access to the Ethernet and Wi-Fi in all university buildings and residence halls.

History
NEFU was officially established in April 2010 on the basis of Ammosov Yakutsk State University, a university with 75 years of history.

The university holds the name of Maksim Kirovich Ammosov, an outstanding statesman of Soviet Yakutia, the son of the Sakha nation and one of the founders of Yakutia and Kyrgyzstan's statehood.

Recent reforms in the Russian Federation created a new network of federal universities. This trend towards integration and modernization in higher university education is typical of many countries. As international experience shows, additional financial support from government promotes the high quality of education and higher performance in international rankings. The North-Eastern Federal University is to become a strategic centre for the formation of a common cultural, scientific and educational space, based on the values of indigenous culture of the peoples of the northeast of Russia, providing quality personal education in a multiethnic environment.

The NEFU development program towards the year 2020 was approved by the federal government on October 7, 2010. The following priority areas were identified: 
 the new quality of the university; 
 efficient environmental management and environmental security; 
 efficient use of mineral resources; 
 the use of science-based technologies and production in the North; 
 the quality of life in the north; 
 the preservation and development of languages and cultures; 
 the analytical and personnel support for innovative socio-economic development of the northeastern part of the Russian Federation.

In all areas of university activities large-scale transformations have been initiated, primarily to create a unified scientific and methodological foundation. A comprehensive plan for the transition to a two-level system of education, scientific and methodical aspects of basic educational programs has been developed, innovative Master’s programs are ready for implementation, and all education departments are being restructured.

Academics

Institutes

 of Medicine
 of Finance and Economics
 of Mathematics and Computer Science
 of Physics and Technologies
 of Sports and Physical Education
 of Foreign Languages and Regional Studies 
 of Psychology
 of Languages and Cultures of the Peoples of the Russian North-East
 Teacher Training
 Technological
 of Civil Engineering
 of Natural Sciences
 Mining

Faculties

 of History
 of Philology
 of Law
 of Road Construction
 of Geology and Survey
 Faculty of Pre-Undergraduate Education offers preparatory courses to schoolchildren

Branches

 Neryungri Technical Institute (branch) of North-Eastern Federal University
 Mirny Polytechnic Institute (branch) of North-Eastern Federal University
 Chukotka branch of North-Eastern Federal University

Research

Institutes 
There are five research institutions including:
 Institute of Mathematics, 
 Health Institute, 
 Institute of Applied Ecology of North with LAZAREV MAMMOTH museum and lab,
 Institute of Regional Economy of North, 
 OLONKHO Institute,
 KULAKOVSKY Institute.

Traditions

Awards 
 A Kate Marsden scholarship is given to the best English language program student each year at the Institute of Foreign Languages and Regional Studies.

Community engagement
 Institute of Lifelong Professional Education
 Faculty of Pre-Undergraduate Education

Notable alumni
 Evgeniya Mikhailova (Educator, researcher, philanthropist, and politician)
 Georgy Balakshin (Olympic boxer)
 Viktor Lebedev (Freestyle wrestler)

Contacts 
58, Belinsky Street, Yakutsk

Sakha Republic (Yakutia), RUSSIAN FEDERATION, 677891

References

External links

Information
-Official site in English

Education in the Sakha Republic
Universities and institutes established in the Soviet Union
 
Yakutsk
Educational institutions established in 1956
Buildings and structures in the Sakha Republic
1956 establishments in Russia
Federal universities of Russia
Universities in the Russian Far East